was a  after Kahō and before Jōtoku. This period spanned the years from December 1096 through November 1097.

Change of Era
 January 28, 1096 : The new era name was created to mark an event or series of events. The previous era ended and the new one commenced in Kahō 3, on the 17th day of the 12th month of 1096.

Events of the Eichō Era
 1096 (Eichō 1): The kampaku Fujiwara no Moromichi was raised to the second rank of the first class
 1096 (Eichō 1): During the summer, a series of great dengaku dance performances unfolded in the streets and in open areas near the city. The participants were drawn from the aristocracy and from the common people; and even the former emperor joined along with members of the Imperial court.

Notes

References
 Brown, Delmer M. and Ichirō Ishida, eds. (1979).  Gukanshō: The Future and the Past. Berkeley: University of California Press. ;  OCLC 251325323
 Nussbaum, Louis-Frédéric and Käthe Roth. (2005).  Japan encyclopedia. Cambridge: Harvard University Press. ;  OCLC 58053128
 Titsingh, Isaac. (1834). Nihon Ōdai Ichiran; ou,  Annales des empereurs du Japon.  Paris: Royal Asiatic Society, Oriental Translation Fund of Great Britain and Ireland. OCLC 5850691
 Varley, H. Paul. (1980). A Chronicle of Gods and Sovereigns: Jinnō Shōtōki of Kitabatake Chikafusa. New York: Columbia University Press. ;  OCLC 6042764

External links
 National Diet Library, "The Japanese Calendar" -- historical overview plus illustrative images from library's collection

Japanese eras